Abies spectabilis, the East Himalayan fir, is a conifer species in the family Pinaceae and the genus Abies. It is sometimes held to include the Bhutan fir (A. densa) as a variety. It is found in Afghanistan, China (Tibet), northern India, Nepal, and Pakistan.

Abies spectabilis has a wide distribution, but it has suffered from logging and deforestation, especially at the lower elevations. In 2011, IUCN assessed it as "Near Threatened".

References

spectabilis
Trees of the Indian subcontinent
Trees of Afghanistan
Trees of China
Flora of Tibet
Taxonomy articles created by Polbot